Qansahdhere (Maay: Qasidheeri), also known as Qansax Dheere, is a town in the southern Bay region of Somalia. The boader Qansahdhere District has a total population of 76,714 residents.

The most local residents of the district are from Gelidle,Yantar, Hubeer, Luway and Emid clan.The main language spoken in the district is Maay language.   

ECONOMY   

Qansaxdheere is a livestock trading hub due to its strategic location. On Mondays and Fridays, business people from the surrounding areas come to this town to trade livestock. Agricultural products also contribute significantly to the town's GDP. Over the last ten years, cultivating has shifted from primarily crops to crops, vegetables, and fruits. Mondays and Fridays have the highest level of economic activity compared to the other days of the week. There are also modern services such as telecommunications, internet access, and shoppings malls.  

HEALTH   

Qansahdhere  has two hospitals ( Qansahdhere Referral Hospital ) and two MCHs (MARDO and URRO ) which mainly carry nutrition support in a mandated form.

Notes

References
Qansaxdheere, Somalia Page

Populated places in Bay, Somalia